Chung Kum Weng (born 15 May 1934) is a Malaysian-Welsh weightlifter. Chung won gold in the 1966 British Empire and Commonwealth Games Featherweight class, and silver in the 1958 British Empire and Commonwealth Games Featherweight class where he represented Wales. He competed for Malaysia at the 1960 Summer Olympics and the 1964 Summer Olympics.

References

External links
 

1934 births
Living people
Malaysian male weightlifters
Olympic weightlifters of Malaya
Olympic weightlifters of Malaysia
Weightlifters at the 1960 Summer Olympics
Weightlifters at the 1964 Summer Olympics
People from Ipoh
Commonwealth Games medallists in weightlifting
Welsh male weightlifters
Commonwealth Games gold medallists for Wales
Commonwealth Games silver medallists for Malaysia
Weightlifters at the 1958 British Empire and Commonwealth Games
Weightlifters at the 1966 British Empire and Commonwealth Games
Medallists at the 1958 British Empire and Commonwealth Games
Medallists at the 1966 British Empire and Commonwealth Games